The William Walker  Filibuster Expedition to Baja California and Sonora occurred in the year of 1853, after a failed attempt by Walker himself to invade Sonora from the Arizona border. William Walker sought to appropriate Sonora, and in his claims he had the support of magnates and the complacency of the United States government . In November 1853 he embarked with two hundred men towards La Paz, where he was able to capture the political chief and proclaimed the independence of the Republic of Baja California, a state that never had recognition nor did it exist in the facts, since Walker never had total control of the peninsula or had the support of the population. Rather, he faced resistance from the army and Mexican civilians, among which the group commanded by Antonio Meléndrez stands out . In spite of being folded in Ensenada and suffering the mutiny of his troops from the United States, Walker proclaimed himself president of the Republic of Sonora , which also included Baja California and that, like its successor, did not have existence in fact nor any recognition. In fact, Walker only reached the territory of Sonora in 1854 when pressured by the navy of the United States and Mexico, he had to flee Ensenada. Before the harassment of Meléndrez and the desertion of another part of his troops, Walker and the remnant of his filibuistero army surrendered in San Diego to the American army. Taken to trial, the judge said he was guilty of violating the Neutrality Law signed between Mexico and the United States after the US invasion of Mexico in 1847 . However, Walker was acquitted by the jury.

Expedition to Baja California 

William Walker was an American doctor and adventurer who had settled in California during the gold rush. He had tried to seize the state of Sonora before launching the Baja California campaign, which was carried out with the support of American magnates - probably among them was William Vanderbilt ; and within the framework of the omission of the California authorities regarding what was an illegal action against a foreign country.

The flag hoisted by William Walker has a star that represents the supposed "Republic of Baja California".
Walker left California, in the company of a group of 45 American mercenaries, on October 17, 1853, with the intention of arriving in Guaymas ( Sonora ) and occupying that Mexican state. However, a year earlier the Mexicans had already repelled an expedition of French filibusters, major in troops and military preparation. Perhaps this made him reconsider Walker, who chose to attack and first take the California peninsula as the first step to seize Sonora. On board the schooner Caroline, the Walker expedition arrived in Cabo San Lucas on October 28of that year. He moved by sea to La Paz, capital of the territory of Baja California, which he occupied five days later by capturing Rafael Espinosa, political head of the territory. In that place, the filibusters lowered the Mexican flag and raised in its place a flag of three horizontal stripes, two red and one white in the center, loaded with two stars representing Baja California and Sonora. 1 The 3 of November 1853, the invaders proclaimed the independence of the peninsula which they called Republic of Baja California. Later, the expedition captured Colonel Juan Clímaco Rebolledo, who came to replace Espinosa in the position of political chief without knowing that the Baja California capital had been taken by the American invaders.

The second flag raised by William Walker has two stars representing the "Republic of Baja California and Sonora".
Since the reinforcements of the expedition from California were slow to arrive, Walker decided to move his operations center to the north of the peninsula, near the border with the United States and the passage by land to Sonora, which was the objective of his ambitions and also those of the US government, which had already expressed its intention to buy the northwest of Mexico. In La Paz there were some clashes between civilians and filibusters, which Walker interpreted as military victories over the Mexican government, which he accused of tyrant and decadent. Already in Ensenada, the filibusters established their headquarters in what are currently the Third and Gastélum streets of that city. 2From there, Walker issued a proclamation to the American people, requesting their support to defend the independence of Baja California, of which he had named himself president. Many American volunteers adhered to Walker's call, adding up to a number of 253 expedition members who arrived in Ensenada on the Anita ship .

Notes 
 ↑ Rosengarten, 2002: 77.
 ↑ Olmeda García, 2010: 20-21.

Sources 
 Olmeda García, María del Pilar (2010). Baja California History of legal institutions . Mexico City: UNAM Legal Research Institute.
 Rosengarten, Frederic (2002). William Walker and the decline of filibusterism . Tegucigalpa: Guaymuras.

Independence